Apogee is an album by saxophonists Pete Christlieb and Warne Marsh recorded in 1978 and released on the Warner Bros. label.

Reception 

The Rolling Stone Jazz Record Guide states "Apogee is an unadulterated burner, guaranteed to work for tenor freaks"
The Allmusic review noted "Apogee is an anomaly in many ways. First, it is a Southern California answer to the great titan tenor battle records of the '40s and '50s. Rather than sounding like a cutting contest, it sounds like a gorgeous exercise in swinging harmony and melodic improvisation by two compadres. ...  the pair engaged a kind of freewheeling, good-time set that remains one of the most harmonically sophisticated recordings to come out of the 1970s". On All About Jazz Chris M. Slawecki observed "It is impossible to distinguish one man’s tenor from the other: sometimes they swing in unison, sometimes harmonizing, sometimes in duet or counterpunching, but they are always strong, meaty and powerful". In Jazz Review, Mark Keresman called it "A sterling set of beautifully recorded, searing, straight-ahead, mainstream bop tenor madness".

Track listing 
 "Magna-tism" (Pete Christlieb) – 7:32
 "317 E. 32nd" (Lennie Tristano) – 6:34
 "Rapunzel" (Donald Fagen, Walter Becker) – 7:15
 "Tenors of the Time" (Joe Roccisano) – 7:42
 "Donna Lee" (Charlie Parker) – 6:35
 "I'm Old Fashioned" (Jerome Kern, Johnny Mercer) – 6:50
 "Lunarcy" (Lou Levy) – 7:13 Bonus track on CD reissue
 "Love Me" – 4:13 Bonus track on CD reissue
 "How About You?" (Burton Lane, Ralph Freed) – 9:37 Bonus track on CD reissue

Personnel 
Pete Christlieb, Warne Marsh – tenor saxophone
Lou Levy – piano
Jim Hughart – bass
Nick Ceroli – drums
Joe Roccisano – arranger (tracks 1–4)

References 

Pete Christlieb albums
Warne Marsh albums
1978 albums
Warner Records albums
Albums produced by Donald Fagen
Albums produced by Walter Becker